The striped flying barb (Esomus lineatus) is a species of cyprinid. It is found in Bangladesh (where it is found in the mouth of the Ganges River), India, and Sri Lanka. Esomus metallicus is also sometimes known as the striped flying barb.

It grows to  total length.

References

Esomus
Fish of Bangladesh
Freshwater fish of India
Freshwater fish of Sri Lanka
Fish described in 1923
Taxa named by Ernst Ahl